Katsuhikari Toshio (born Toshio Sugiura; 9 August 1942 – 1 January 2018) was a Japanese sumo wrestler. He made his professional debut in November 1958 and reached the top division in September 1969. His highest rank was maegashira 1. Upon retirement from active competition he became an elder in the Japan Sumo Association under the name Wakafuji. He reached the Sumo Association's mandatory retirement age in August 2007. He died from cancer of the bile duct on 1 January 2018 aged 75.

Career record

See also
Glossary of sumo terms
List of past sumo wrestlers
List of sumo tournament second division champions

References

1942 births
2018 deaths
People from Gamagōri
Japanese sumo wrestlers
Sumo people from Aichi Prefecture
Deaths from cholangiocarcinoma
Deaths from cancer in Japan